Leșu is a commune in Bistrița-Năsăud County, Transylvania, Romania. It is composed of two villages, Leșu and Lunca Leșului.

References

Communes in Bistrița-Năsăud County
Localities in Transylvania